Tetrigimyia is a genus of tachinid flies in the family Tachinidae.

Species
Tetrigimyia minor Shima & Takahashi, 2011

Distribution
Japan.

References

Exoristinae
Diptera of Asia
Tachinidae genera
Monotypic Brachycera genera